The Razi Vaccine and Serum Research Institute (romanized: Mo'asseseh-ye Tahqiqât-e Vâksan va Seromsâzi-e Râzi)  is an Iranian pharmaceutical and biological institute. It is located in the Hessarak district in Karaj, Iran. The Institute was built as a national center with the purpose of countering epidemics in domestic animals during Reza Shah era. Further departments were installed, including those dedicated to human medicines. In modern years, the Institute has focused primarily on nanomedicine and biotechnology.

The Institute is known for its anti-venom serums derived from snake and scorpion venom. It hosts some reference pharmaceutical laboratories with regional or state scopes.

Branches
The Institute has established regional branches in:
 Arak
 Ahvaz
 Kerman
 Mashhad
 Marand
 Shiraz

History

Production timeline
 1924: Institution of the institute.
 1932: Louis Delpy, a French veterinarian, drove the institute to overcome an epidemic of cattle plague in the region.
 1933: Anthrax
 1935: Sheep Pox
 1936: Livestock Gangrene
 1937: Cattle Pasteurellosis
 1941: Serums and vaccines for diphtheria and tetanus
 1970: Polio
 1987: Rubella and Measles
 1998: Aleppo Boil
 1992: Foundation of the biotechnology department.
 1997: Enhancement of the biotechnology department.
 2010: The institute produced 1.7 billion doses of 57 types of vaccines, serums, and antigens per year.
 2012: Production of transgenic animals, creating recombinant vaccines through genetic engineering, developing antigens and diagnostic kits for medical and veterinary labs.
 2021: Razi Cov Pars: a COVID-19 vaccine

Current research projects
 Creation of stem cell lines from mice fetuses through cloning
 Design and production of engineered skin tissue
 Molecular analysis of the CDS gene in cattle to diagnose genetic defects
 Production of hybrid cells
 Production of recombinant vaccines
 Production of a monoclonal antibody for measles

History points
 The facility was used as a Soviet military base during World War II
 NATO forces used some of the Institute's anti-venom products during the Afghanistan war, since Afghan native snakes had not been researched in the USA or Europe.

See also
 Pharmaceuticals in Iran

References

External links
 

Pharmaceutical research institutes
1924 establishments in Iran
Medical and health organisations based in Iran
Research institutes established in 1924
Medical research institutes in Iran
COVID-19 vaccine producers